The Millionaire's Wife is a 2016 Philippine television drama romance series broadcast by GMA Network. Directed by Albert Langitan, it stars Andrea Torres in the title role. It premiered on March 14, 2016, on the network's Afternoon Prime line up replacing Destiny Rose. The series concluded on June 24, 2016, with a total of 72 episodes. It was replaced by Sa Piling ni Nanay in its timeslot.

The series is streaming online on YouTube.

Premise
Louisa Ignacio, a single mother who settles in a marriage for convenience with an older man. She vows to be a wife to him in exchange of giving her son who has diabetes. After she agrees to marry Fred, Louisa will face the consequences of her decision which involves her stepdaughter, her stepdaughter's children, her child and the father of her child.

Cast and characters

Lead cast
 Andrea Torres as Luisa Ignacio-Vergara/Meneses

Supporting cast
 Mike Tan as Ivan Meneses
 Robert Arevalo as Alfredo "Fredo" Vergara
 Jaclyn Jose as Stella Vergara-Montecillo
 Ina Raymundo as Allison Montecillo
 Sid Lucero as Jared Montecillo
 James Blanco as Mike Crisostomo
 Rich Asuncion as Rosario "Rio" Samson

Guest cast
 Mymy Davao as Susan Samson
 Gilleth Sandico as Esme Meneses
 Jhoana Marie Tan as Sheila Meneses
 Luz Fernandez as Delia Cruz
 Louise Bolton as Elaine
 Denise Barbacena as Grace
 Aaron Yanga as a nurse
 Dave Roy Sotero as Rico
 Rob Moya as Jared's friend
 Billy James Renacia as Jared's friend
 Ku Aquino as Robert
 Arrly Enriquez as Ronron
 Stephanie Sol as Georgia Samson
 Justin Guevarra as Antonio "Anthony" Obras
 Sanya Lopez as Lovely
 Jade Lopez as Carla
 Mayton Eugenio as Selena Buenaluz

Ratings
According to AGB Nielsen Philippines' Mega Manila household television ratings, the pilot episode of The Millionaire's Wife earned a 14.9% rating. While the final episode scored a 19.2% rating.

References

External links

2016 Philippine television series debuts
2016 Philippine television series endings
Filipino-language television shows
GMA Network drama series
Philippine romance television series
Television shows set in the Philippines